Nine business routes of Interstate 44 (I-44) exist, all of them within the state of Missouri.

Joplin business loop

Interstate 44 Business (I-44 Bus.) in Joplin runs north from I-44 along Main Street until it reaches Route 66 (7th Street), where it turns east. It then runs through Duquesne and Duenweg. I-44 Bus. has a diamond interchange with Route 249 between Duquesne and Duenweg.

Sarcoxie business loop

Interstate 44 Business (I-44 Bus.) through Sarcoxie begins running south from I-44 concurrent with Route 37. It then splits off at Blackberry Street, which becomes High Street upon entering Sarcoxie. After leaving the town, I-44 Bus. angles northeast and ends at I-44. This road is part of former U.S. Route 166 (US 166), which preceded I-44 through the area.

Mount Vernon business loop

Interstate 44 Business (I-44 Bus.) in Mount Vernon runs along Mount Vernon Road. The east half of the highway is concurrent with Route 39. I-44 Bus. runs largely along the former route of US 166.

Springfield business loop

Interstate 44 Business (I-44 Bus.) in Springfield begins at the eastern terminus of Route 266 and runs east along Chestnut Expressway, intersecting US 160 and Route 13. It then runs along the north edge of downtown Springfield. I-44 Bus. turns north at Glenstone Avenue, concurrent with U.S. Route 65 Business (US 65 Bus.). It then ends where Glenstone meets I-44.

Lebanon business loop

Interstate 44 Business (I-44 Bus.) in Lebanon began at the westernmost Lebanon exit and ended at the easternmost exit. The route followed former US 66 for its entire length. I-44 Bus. followed Springfield Road, then curved off and became Elm Street. At Jefferson Street, it finally junctioned with Route 5, Route 32, and Route 64. The designation was removed in 2021.

Waynesville–St. Robert business loop

Interstate 44 Business (I-44 Bus.) in the Waynesville–St. Robert area begins on the westside of Waynesville at exit 156. The road briefly heads north on Ichord Avenue, then heads east on a concurrency with Route 17. The road, at this point, also becomes Historic Route 66. I-44 Bus. continues east, past the Pulaski County Courthouse in the old part of the city (where Route 17 turns off north). The route then climbs a steep hill and rounds a curve underneath a rock overhang painted like a frog. I-44 Bus. continues into St. Robert, and the lanes split with a Roadside Park between them. It passes on through St. Robert, ending at exit 161, which is also the exit for the Fort Leonard Wood I-44 business spur.

Major intersections

Fort Leonard Wood business spur

Interstate 44 Business (I-44 Bus.) is a short route connecting the Waynesville–St. Robert I-44 business loop with the main north gate of Fort Leonard Wood. The highway is lined with businesses and is also called Missouri Avenue, whose name continues into Fort Leonard Wood. It is an old alignment of Route 17.

Major intersections

Rolla business loop

Interstate 44 Business (I-44 Bus.) in Rolla begins at the westernmost Rolla exit and ends at the easternmost exit. The route follows former US 66 its entire length. The road is Kingshighway to Bishop Avenue, where the road joins northbound US 63, with which it is concurrent to I-44. Near the Missouri University of Science and Technology is a model of Stonehenge.

Pacific business loop

Interstate 44 Business (I-44 Bus.) is a former routing of US 66 through downtown Pacific. This portion of road was designated a business loop of I-44 after the Interstate was built to bypass the town. US 50 was then rerouted onto I-44, making this portion a business loop after US 66 was removed from the area in 1979. After I-44 Bus.'s western terminus, the road continues solely as Historic Route 66 until an intersection with Route 100.

References

External links
Interstate Business Routes @ Interstate-Guide.com: Business Route 44

44
Interstate 44